The Loves of Mars and Venus by John Weaver was arguably the first modern ballet, the first dance work to tell a story through dance, gesture and music alone.  Its first performance was at London's Drury Lane Theatre on Saturday 2 March 1717.

Background 

Before 1717 ballet had always been part of operas and plays and dependent on their words to narrate the drama. The Loves of Mars and Venus was a danced drama, equal to the plays seen on London’s stage, described in its own time as a ‘Dramatic Entertainment of Dancing’, “the first of this kind produced upon the British Stage or in the Kingdom”. All the action was conveyed in dance and mime alone, setting a pattern for future ballets”.

The story 

Weaver’s ballet tells the story of the love affair between Venus, the goddess of love, and Mars, the god of war, and the revenge enacted on them by her husband Vulcan. It draws on classical mythology, but contemporary passions abound, and its immediate source was Peter Anthony Motteux's play, The Loves of Mars and Venus, written in 1695. Despite Weaver’s appeal to the revered performances of the ‘mimes and pantomimes’ of classical antiquity, who he wished to emulate, his ballet was a thoroughly modern work in tune with the sophisticated comedies of his own time.

The Loves of Mars and Venus told the familiar story in six short scenes full of dancing and gestures. It lasted, perhaps, 40 minutes. Mars appears with his soldiers and performs a war dance. Venus is shown surrounded by the Graces and displays her allure in a sensual passacaille, but when Vulcan arrives she quarrels with him in a dance ‘of the pantomimic kind’. Vulcan retires to his smithy to devise revenge with the help of his workmen the Cyclops. Mars and Venus meet and, with their followers, perform dances expressive of love and desire. Vulcan completes his plan of revenge against the lovers. In the final scene, Vulcan and the Cyclops catch Mars and Venus together and expose them to the derision of the other gods, until Neptune intervenes and harmony is restored in a final ‘Grand Dance’.

The performance 

At the first performances of The Loves of Mars and Venus, Mars was danced by Louis Dupré, Venus was Hester Santlow and John Weaver himself danced Vulcan. Dupré was a virtuoso dancer who was probably French, although he was probably not the famous ‘Le grand’ Dupré of the Paris Opera. Mrs Santlow was an English dancer-actress, greatly admired for her beauty as well as her dancing skills – one contemporary described her as ‘incomparable’. Weaver’s stage skills were essentially those of a comic dancer, although he was obviously also a master of rhetorical gesture. They were supported by Drury Lane’s best dancers as the ‘Followers’ of Mars and Venus, with the company’s comedians as Weaver’s workmen the Cyclops.

Reception and subsequent history 

The Loves of Mars and Venus was an undoubted success, with seven performances during its first season and revivals at the Drury Lane Theatre until 1724. Colley Cibber the English actor- manager, playwright and Poet Laureate, said of it ‘To give even Dancing therefore some Improvement; and to make it something more than Motion without Meaning, the Fable of Mars and Venus, was form’d into a connected Presentation of Dances in Character, wherein the Passions were so happily expressed, and the whole Story so intelligibly told, by a mute Narration of Gesture only, that even thinking Spectators allow’d it both a pleasing and a rational Entertainment’. It also inspired a parody version by John Rich
It was subsequently far more influential than many realise. It may well have been seen by the young French ballerina Marie Sallé, who would herself later experiment with narrative and expressive dancing. Sallé, of course, influenced the choreographer Jean-Georges Noverre when he came to create his ballets d’action. They led to the story ballets of the romantic period and onwards to the narrative dance works for which English ballet became famous in the 20th century.

300th anniversary performance 

The Weaver Dance Company, now The Weaver Ensemble, was founded in 2016, initially to produce a show to celebrate the 300th anniversary of the first performance of The Loves of Mars and Venus. Weaver created a patchwork to make his musical score, a pasticcio, but it has been lost. So a pasticcio was pieced together using music from the London stage of the day with works by Jean-Baptiste Lully (1632–87), Jacques Paisible (c1656-1721), Henry Purcell (1659–95), Gottfried Finger (c1660-1730), John Eccles (1668-1735), Jeremiah Clarke (c1674-1704), and William Croft (1678-1727), using Weaver’s text as a guide.

As a reconstruction of the full dance-drama with its cast of 26 characters was beyond the Company’s resources, they set out to create a show that would introduce the audience to the world of the 18th-century London stage and John Weaver’s frustrations with the limitations of dancing there, following Weaver as he tries to create his first ‘Dramatick Entertainment of Dancing’ with dance taking an equal place as an art alongside music and drama.

Using John Weaver’s own published scenario to reconstruct the gestures and theatrical dances recorded in Beauchamp–Feuillet notation in the early 18th century as the basis for new choreography, The Weaver Dance Company presented their The Loves of Mars and Venus, exactly 300 years to the day after the first performance, at the Fitzwilliam College Auditorium in Cambridge on 2 March 2017.  A number of other performances have followed around England.

References 

1717 ballet premieres